Frigidaire was a comics magazine published in Rome, Italy. The magazine had significant effects on graphic design, illustrations and written speech in the country during the 1980s. In 2008 it folded, and from 2009 it became a supplement of Liberazione, a defunct communist newspaper.

History and profile
Frigidaire was established in 1980. The first issue appeared in November. The founders were Vincenzo Sparagna, Stefano Tamburini, Filippo Scòzzari, Andrea Pazienza, Massimo Mattioli, and Tanino Liberatore. The magazine had its headquarters in Rome.

In addition to cartoons Frigidaire featured avant-garde reportages and interviews and covers articles on visual art. It also included investigative reports. Over time the magazine became a mouthpiece for left-wing counterculture in the country.

At the beginning of the 2000s the frequency of Frigidaire was switched to bi-monthly. In 2003 Vincenzo Sparagna sold the publisher of the magazine, which was temporarily ceased publication from April–May 2003 to 2006. On 25 April 2009 the magazine began to be published as an insert of Liberazione, a communist daily.

In September 2002, the covers and some selected pages of the magazine were exhibited at the 7th International Comics Festival in Athens.

See also
 List of avant-garde magazines
 List of magazines in Italy

References

External links
 

1980 establishments in Italy
2008 disestablishments in Italy
Avant-garde magazines
Bi-monthly magazines published in Italy
Defunct political magazines published in Italy
Italian-language magazines
Italian political satire
Magazines established in 1980
Magazines disestablished in 2008
Magazines published in Rome
Newspaper supplements
Satirical magazines published in Italy